Escapade in Florence is a two-part episode of the Disneyland television show which was released theatrically in some countries. Walt Disney described it as a "two-part teenage comedy adventure" which was "international in flavor". The show first aired on September 30 and October 7, 1962, and was repeated in June 1963 and June 1969.

Plot
Mystery and suspense follow Annette Funicello and Tommy Kirk as they play students studying in the enchanting city of Florence, Italy. As the two find romance among the city's magnificent art and architecture, they discover that her paintings are at the center of an elaborate art forgery ring involving Florence's most treasured masterpieces. Danger soon finds them when they uncover the mastermind behind the plot and they're thrown into an ancient dungeon. It's now up to Annette to save the day, but will help arrive in time?

Cast
Tommy Kirk as Tommy Carpenter
Annette Funicello as Annette Aliotto
Nino Castelnuovo as Bruno
Clelia Matania as Aunt Gisella
Venantino Venantini as Lorenzo
Ivan Desny as Count Roberto
Odoardo Spadaro as Padrone
Carlo Rizzo as Uncle Mario
Renzo Palmer as Carabiniere
Richard Watson as Butler
Helen Stirling as Miss Brooks
Ivan Triesault as Professor Levenson

Production
The film was based on a book by Edward Fenton called The Golden Doors which was published in July 1957. Disney bought the rights in December 1957.

In May 1959 Winston Miller was writing a script for producer William Anderson.

It was shot on location in Florence, Italy. Shooting finished in May 1962. Funicello wrote that Italy was her favourite location ever .

Release
The Monthly Film Bulletin called it "an almost perfect example of its genre - straightforward story, likeable young protagonists, some good rough and tumble with the hero's skill in jiu jitsu coming in useful, pleasant songs, a general happy atmosphere, and a strong location background."

Diabolique said it "very much puts Kirk front and center, and he is charming as an American abroad getting into hijinks with art thieves."

The film was released in September 2013 on DVD via the Disney Movie Club Exclusives.

Comic book adaption
 Gold Key: Escapade in Florence (January 1963)

References

External links
 
 

1962 films
1962 American television episodes
English-language television shows
Films set in Florence
Films shot in Tuscany
Television episodes set in Italy
Walt Disney anthology television series episodes
Films adapted into comics
Films edited from television programs
Films based on mystery novels
1960s English-language films